Copper Mountain is an unincorporated community and a census-designated place (CDP) located in and governed by Summit County, Colorado, United States. The CDP is a part of the Breckenridge, CO Micropolitan Statistical Area. The population of the Copper Mountain CDP was 385 at the United States Census 2010. The Copper Mountain Consolidated Metropolitan District provides services. The Frisco post office  serves the area. The Copper Mountain CDP includes the Copper Mountain Ski Resort and Copper Mountain village.

History
Copper Mountain was originally named "Wheeler" for a local judge and developer, and it has also been known as "Wheeler Station" in the past. The naming question was settled by a decision from the Board on Geographic Names, which ruled in favor of "Copper Mountain" in 1977.

Geography

Demographics

See also

Outline of Colorado
Index of Colorado-related articles
State of Colorado
Colorado cities and towns
Colorado census designated places
Colorado counties
Colorado metropolitan areas
Silverthorne, CO Micropolitan Statistical Area
White River National Forest
Copper Mountain Ski Resort

References

External links

Copper Mountain @ Colorado.com
Copper Mountain @ UncoverColorado.com
Copper Mountain Consolidated Metropolitan District website
Copper Mountain Resort Association website
Copper Mountain Ski Resort website
Summit County website
White River National Forest website

Census-designated places in Summit County, Colorado
Census-designated places in Colorado